Listings on the National Register of Historic Places are found in all five counties (boroughs) of New York City.

 National Register of Historic Places listings in Bronx County, New York
 National Register of Historic Places listings in Kings County, New York (Brooklyn)
 National Register of Historic Places listings in New York County, New York (Manhattan)
 National Register of Historic Places listings in Queens County, New York
 National Register of Historic Places listings in Richmond County, New York (Staten Island)